Sławomir Fabicki (born 5 April 1970) is a Polish film director and screenwriter. His film Z odzysku was screened in the Un Certain Regard section at the 2006 Cannes Film Festival.

Filmography
 Wewnętrzny 55 (1997)
 Bratobójstwo (1999)
 Męska sprawa (2001)
 Z odzysku (2006)
 Miłość (2012)

References

External links

Sławomir Fabicki at culture.pl

1970 births
Living people
Polish film directors
Polish screenwriters
Film people from Warsaw
Łódź Film School alumni